Prenatal care, also known as antenatal care, is a type of preventive healthcare. It is provided in the form of medical checkups, consisting of recommendations on managing a healthy lifestyle and the provision of medical information such as maternal physiological changes in pregnancy, biological changes, and prenatal nutrition including prenatal vitamins, which prevents potential health problems throughout the course of the pregnancy and promotes the mother and child's health alike. The availability of routine prenatal care, including prenatal screening and diagnosis, has played a part in reducing the frequency of maternal death, miscarriages, birth defects, low birth weight, neonatal infections and other preventable health problems.

Traditional prenatal care in high-income countries generally consists of:
 monthly visits during the first two trimesters (from the 1st week to the 28th week)
 fortnightly visits from the 28th week to the 36th week of pregnancy
 weekly visits after 36th week to the delivery, from the 38th week to the 42nd week
 Assessment of parental needs and family dynamics

The traditional form of antenatal care has developed from the early 1900s and there is very little research to suggest that it is the best way of giving antenatal care. Antenatal care can be costly and uses many staff. The following paragraphs describe research on other forms of antenatal care, which may reduce the burden on maternity services in all countries.

Visits numbers

The WHO recommends that pregnant women should all receive at least eight antenatal visits to spot and treat problems and give immunizations. Although antenatal care is important to improve the health of both mother and baby, many women do not receive eight visits.
There is little evidence behind the number of antenatal visits, pregnant women receive and what care and information is given at each visit. It has been suggested that women who have low-risk pregnancies should have fewer antenatal visits. However, when this was tested, women with fewer visits had babies who were much more likely to be admitted to neonatal intensive care and stay there for longer (though this could down to chance results). A 2015 Cochrane Review findings buttresses this notion, with evidence that in settings with limited resources, where the number of visits is already low, programmes of ANC with reduced visits are associated with an increase in perinatal mortality. Therefore, it is doubtful that the reduced visits model is ideal, even in low income countries (LICs), where pregnant women are already attending fewer appointments. Not only is visiting prenatal care early is highly recommended, but also a more flexible pathway allowing more visits, from the time a pregnant woman books for prenatal care, as it potentially enables more attention to those women who come late. Also, women who had fewer antenatal visits were not as satisfied with the care they received compared with women who had the standard number of visits. A new alternative for some of the routine prenatal care visits is Telemedicine.

There are many ways of changing health systems to help women access antenatal care, such as new health policies, educating health workers and health service re-organisation. Community interventions to help people change their behavior can also play a part. Examples of interventions are media campaigns reaching many people, enabling communities to take control of their own health, informative-education-communication interventions and financial incentives. A review looking at these interventions found that one intervention helps improve the number of women receiving antenatal care. However interventions used together may reduce baby deaths in pregnancy and early life, lower numbers of low birth weight babies born and improve numbers of women receiving antenatal care.

The World Health Organization (WHO) reported that in 2015 around 830 women died every day from problems in pregnancy and childbirth. Only 5 lived in high-income countries. The rest lived in low-income countries.

A study examined the differences in early and low-weight birth deliveries between local and immigrant women and saw the difference caused by prenatal care received. The study, between 1997 and 2008, looked at 21,708 women giving birth in a region of Spain. The results indicated that very preterm birth (VPTB) and very low birth weight (VLBW) were much more common for immigrants than locals (Castelló et al., 2012). The study showed the importance of prenatal care and how universal prenatal care would help people of all origins get proper care before pregnancy/birth (Castelló et al., 2012).

Group versus individual care

Group antenatal care has a couple of obvious benefits: it costs less than one-to-one visits and the women have more hours of care as a group than on their own. Only small studies have been conducted looking at group care but they have found that mothers knew more about pregnancy, birth and parenting in the group setting. The mothers reported liking the group care and the review found no difference between how the pregnancies developed between the group and individual settings.

Midwife-led care

Midwife-led care for low-risk women is where a midwife team (and GP if needed) leads the care a woman receives and she does not usually see a specialist doctor in her pregnancy. Women with midwife-led pregnancies are more likely to give birth without being induced but have natural labours. However they are less likely to have their waters broken, an instrumental delivery, episiotomy or preterm birth. Around the same number of women in each group had a caesarean section.

Prenatal examinations

At the initial antenatal care visit and with the aid of a special booking checklist the pregnant women become classified into either normal risk or high risk.

In many countries, women are given a summary of their case notes including important background information about their pregnancy, such as their medical history, growth charts and any scan reports. If the mother goes to a different hospital for care or to give birth the summary of her case notes can be used by the midwives and doctors until her hospital notes arrive.

A review looking into women keeping their own case notes shows they have more risk of having a caesarean section. However the women reported feeling more in control having their notes and would like to have them again in future pregnancies. 25% of women reported their hospital notes were lost in hospital though none of the women forgot to take their own notes to any appointments.

Prenatal diagnosis or prenatal screening (note that "Prenatal Diagnosis" and "Prenatal Screening" refer to two different types of tests) is testing for diseases or conditions in a fetus or embryo before it is born. Obstetricians and midwives have the ability to monitor mother's health and prenatal development during pregnancy through series of regular check-ups.

Physical examinations generally consist of:
 Collection of (mother's) medical history
 Checking (mother's) blood pressure
 (Mother's) height and weight
 Pelvic exam
 Doppler fetal heart rate monitoring
 (Mother's) blood and urine tests
 Discussion with caregiver

In some countries, such as the UK, the symphysial fundal height (SFH) is measured as part of antenatal appointments from 25 weeks gestation.  (The SFH is measured from the woman's pubic bone to the top of the uterus.) A review into this practice found only one piece of research so there is not enough evidence to say whether measuring the SFH helps to detect small or large babies. As measuring the SFH is not costly and is used in many places, the review recommends carrying on this practice.

Growth charts are a way of detecting small babies by the measuring the SFH. There are two types of growth chart:
 Population based chart, which shows a standard growth and size for each baby
 Customized growth chart, which is worked out by looking at the mother's height and weight, and the weights of their previous babies.
A review looking into which of these charts detected small babies found that there is no good quality research to show which is best. More research is needed before the customized growth charts are recommended because they cost more money and take more time for the health care workers to make.

Obstetric ultrasounds are most commonly performed during the second trimester at approximately week 20. Ultrasounds are considered relatively safe and have been used for over 35 years for monitoring pregnancy.
Among other things, ultrasounds are used to:
 Diagnose pregnancy (uncommon)
 Check for multiple fetuses
 Assess possible risks to the mother (e.g., miscarriage, blighted ovum, ectopic pregnancy, or a molar pregnancy condition)
 Check for fetal malformation (e.g., club foot, spina bifida, cleft palate, clenched fists)
 Determine if an intrauterine growth retardation condition exists
 Note the development of fetal body parts (e.g., heart, brain, liver, stomach, skull, other bones)
 Check the amniotic fluid and umbilical cord for possible problems
 Determine due date (based on measurements and relative developmental progress)

Generally an ultrasound is ordered whenever an abnormality is suspected or along a schedule similar to the following:
 7 weeks — confirm pregnancy, ensure that it's neither molar or ectopic, determine due date
 13–14 weeks (some areas) — evaluate the possibility of Down syndrome
 18–20 weeks — see the expanded list above
 34 weeks (some areas) — evaluate size, verify placental position

A review looking at routine ultrasounds past 24 weeks found that there is no evidence to show any benefits to the mother or the baby.

Early scans mean that multiple pregnancies can be detected at an early stage of pregnancy and also gives more accurate due dates so that less women are induced who do not need to be.

Levels of feedback from the ultrasound can differ. High feedback is when the parents can see the screen and are given a detailed description of what they can see. Low feedback is when the findings are discussed at the end and the parents are given a picture of the ultrasound. The different ways of giving feedback affect how much the parents worry and the mother's health behaviour although there is not enough evidence to make clear conclusions. In a small study, mothers receiving high feedback were more likely to stop smoking and drinking alcohol however the quality of the study is low and more research is needed to say for certain which type of feedback is better.

Women experiencing a complicated pregnancy may have a test called a Doppler ultrasound to look at the blood flow to their unborn baby. This is performed to detect signs that the baby is not getting a normal blood flow and therefore is 'at risk'. A review looked at performing Doppler ultrasounds on all women even if they were at 'low risk' of having complications. The review found that routine Doppler ultrasounds may have reduced the number of preventable baby deaths but the evidence was not strong enough to recommend that they should be made routine for all pregnant women.

United States

Proper prenatal care affects all women of various social backgrounds. While availability of such services have considerable personal health and social benefits, socioeconomic problems prevent its universal adoption in both developing and developed nations, such as the US. Although women can benefit by utilizing prenatal care services, there exists various levels of health care accessibility between different demographics throughout the United States.

See also
 Reproductive Health Supplies Coalition

References

Further reading

External links
 Pregnancy Education
 CDC US birth and prenatal care statistics
 EngenderHealth-Prenatal Care and Planning
 Care and Planning

Childbirth

Midwifery